St Charles College, founded in 1875, is a Christian, independent boys college situated in Pietermaritzburg, South Africa, catering for day boys from Grade 000 to Matric, with boarders from Grade 4 upwards.

History 

St Charles Grammar School for Boys was established on 26 July 1875 by Bishop Charles Jolivet of the Order of Mary Immaculate (OMI), in Loop Street, Pietermaritzburg. The school was later sold to the Marist Brothers in 1912 who renamed it St Charles College. Growth was so substantial that 14 years later it was necessary to move the college out of its cramped buildings in the city to the suburb of Scottsville, also in Pietermaritzburg. Undergoing rapid expansion, particularly in the 1950s, the future of St Charles was seemingly assured until, with declining interest in vocations in the Catholic Church, the college almost closed its doors in 1978. It was saved by the eleventh-hour intervention of a small group of Old Boys who worked to re-establish the college, resulting in a non-denominational school with a secular Headmaster.

Significant dates 

 1875 – 26 July – St Charles Grammar School (SCGS) for Boys founded by Bishop Charles Constant Jolivet, Catholic Bishop of Natal, at Allard House, Loop Street
 1877 – SCGS moves across Loop Street to Bishop Jolivet's Episcopal Palace
 1883 – SCGS moves to St Mary's Parish Hall, Longmarket Street
 1901 – SCGS moves next door to St Charles School buildings, Longmarket Street
 1913 – St Charles School bought by the Marist Brothers – buildings re-vamped and enlarged for the whole of 1913 – no teaching takes place
 1914 – January – St Charles School, renamed St Charles College, re-opens for classes
 1925 – January – St Charles College moves to new buildings in Harwin Road, Scottsville. Old school buildings become the Ansonia Hotel
 1973 – 18 September – Board of Governors formed to assist Marist Brothers in the management of the School
 1979 – 1 January – first non-Brother Headmaster, Mr Wynne Bowden. St Charles now non-denominational, Christian school. From Class 1 to Matric, 136 boys form St Charles College
 1991 – O'Meara House disbanded
 2012 – 800 boys in the school, of which 190 are boarders.
 2012 – O'Meara House reinstated

Academics

Cambridge International Examinations 

St Charles College offers Cambridge International Examinations (CIE) in the senior school. In 2002, Previous headmaster Ronnie Kuhn, implemented CIE Examinations into the school system and 2012 marked the tenth anniversary that St. Charles College has benefited from using CIE. Students in grade 10, write IGCSE and students in grade 11 and 12 write AS and A Levels, the GCE Advanced Level.

Subjects offered

Sports

Facilities 

The school is situated on 35ha of land in Scottsville Pietermaritzburg. St Charles College provides a large variety of sports.

Basketball 
St. Charles College is one of the South Africas' top basketball playing schools, being consistently ranked in the top 10. A number of its pupils have represented Kwazulu-Natal & South Africa over the years in various age groups, including the senior national team.

The school in its basketball playing history, has also produced highly successful coach Stewart Bradford, also a former pupil and Head boy of the school who once went on to become a national team selector. St. Charles basketball owed much of its earlier years success to his leadership as 1st team coach, which included coaching the school to a national basketball championship title win in 1998.

The school enjoys rivalries with South Africas' top basketball playing school, Durban High School and a much bigger rivalry with fellow Pietermaritzburg high school basketball powerhouse Maritzburg College.

Facilities include:

Sports offered 
St. Charles College has been performing very well on sports during the year. 
 Athletics
 Basketball
 Cricket
 Cross country running
 Golf
 Field hockey
 Rugby
 Rugby sevens
 Soccer
 Squash
 Swimming
 Tennis
 Waterpolo

Houses 

There are currently four houses at St. Charles College, with equal numbers of students in each. O'Meara House was disbanded by former Principal, Mr Ronnie Kuhn, in 1991 due to small numbers at the college in the early years of his Principalship. Kuhn's reasoning for disbanding O'Meara House was that the numbers at the Senior School were at about 180 which meant four Houses had approximately 45 boys each – three Houses meant 60 boys per House.

 O'Meara House (Green)  – O'Meara House was named after arguably the most prominent benefactor of the School – after founder, Charles Jolivet. Thomas Patrick O'Meara was a very successful timber merchant in the city with three sons at the School: G O'Meara, James Justin O'Meara and Michael Henry O'Meara. The last two were killed in the First World War – and are duly recorded on the Roll of Honour in the chapel. TP O'Meara was a great benefactor of the college and a good friend of founder Bishop Charles Constant Jolivet. He was still going strong in an officiating role at the college in the late 1920s – he died on 19 February 1929 at age 90.
 Conway House (Red)  – was named after Miss Mary Conway – the singing and music teacher who arranged the concerts in the Old Scott's Theatre. Mary Conway, daughter of James Patrick Conway (1885–1914) had her sister, Ellen Hunter (née Conway) a music teacher at St Charles College as well.
 Delalle House (Yellow)  – was named after Fr Henri Delalle, Principal of the School in 1896 – he later became Bishop. He was instrumental in getting the Marist Brothers to take over the School in 1913.
 Smith House (Blue)  – was named after Mr John Leslie Smith, a model pupil at the School in the early to late teens of the 20th century – and a great benefactor of St Charles College – as have his family members over the years subsequently – Mr Patrick Leslie Smith and Mark Leslie Smith.

Notable Alumnae
 Denis Hurley (bishop) - Roman Catholic Vicar Apostolic of Natal and Bishop, Archbishop of Durban
 Pierre de Charmoy – Singer & songwriter
 Mike Antelme - South Africa national rugby team player
 Matthew Dobson – Rugby Union player
 King Misuzulu Zulu – reigning King of the Zulu nation
 Arthur Harcourt – Cricketer and judge
 Sarel Erwee -South Africa national cricket team player
 Graeme Beghin – Cricketer
 Wesley Madhevere – Zimbabwe national cricket team player
 Matthew Sates – Olympic Swimmer
 Mbongeni Mtshali – Fulbright Scholar & Theatre Director
 Michael Phelps - Non-Olympic swimmer and recognised by faculty (Prizegiving 2000 ceremony) as Chief Anarchist

References

External links 

 

1875 establishments in the Colony of Natal
Boarding schools in South Africa
Boys' schools in South Africa
Cambridge schools in South Africa
Educational institutions established in 1875
Private schools in KwaZulu-Natal
Buildings and structures in Pietermaritzburg